Rocky River High School is a public high school in Rocky River, Ohio, suburb of Cleveland, Ohio. Rocky River High School is located on the corner of Wagar & Detroit.

Demographics
The demographic breakdown of the 849 students enrolled for 2016-17 was:
Male - 47.7%
Female - 52.3%
Native American/Alaskan - 0.4%
Asian - 1.8%
Black - 1.3%
Hispanic - 3.3%
White - 90.9%
Multiracial - 2.4%

11.1% of the students were eligible for free or reduced-cost lunch.

Athletics
The school colors are maroon and white. The athletic teams are known as the Pirates. Rocky River High School has been a member of the Great Lakes Conference since the dissolution of the West Shore Conference in 2015.

Ohio High School Athletic Association State Championships
 Boys Track and Field - 1923, 1924, 1927
 Girls Soccer - 2013

Notable alumni

Nina Blackwood (Class of 1970), former MTV VJ and current SiriusXM Satellite Radio host on the 80s on 8 channel 
Carter Camper, NHL ice hockey player 
Nev Chandler (Class of 1964), media personality and former radio voice of the Cleveland Browns
Michael Chernus (Class of 1995), actor in multiple movies and TV shows
Arthur D. Collins, Jr. (Class of 1965), Chairman & CEO, Medtronic, Inc. Medtronic, Inc.
Eric Egan (Class of 2011), vocalist of punk band Heart Attack Man
Forrest Faison (Class of 1976), U.S. Navy Surgeon General
 "Swingin'" Sammy Kaye, Big Band leader
Jann Klose, pop singer songwriter, as an exchange student from Germany
Pat McCormick (Class of 1945), actor in Smokey and the Bandit and its two sequels - writer for The Jack Paar Show, Get Smart, The Danny Kaye Show
Martin Savidge (Class of 1976), former CNN reporter and current NBC News reporter
Michael Stanley (Class of 1966), of the Michael Stanley Band

Notes and references

External links
Rocky River High School website
Rocky River City School District website

High schools in Cuyahoga County, Ohio
Public high schools in Ohio